The Roman Catholic Diocese of Tulcán is a diocese located in the city of Tulcán in the Ecclesiastical province of Quito in Ecuador.

Ordinaries
Luis Clemente de la Vega Rodriguez (17 Mar 1965 – 4 May 1987)
Germán Trajano Pavón Puente (28 Jan 1989 – 19 Apr 2001), appointed Bishop of Ambato
Luis Antonio Sánchez Armijos, S.D.B. (15 Jun 2002 – 22 Feb 2010), appointed Bishop of Machala
Fausto Gaibor García (4 May 2011 – 4 Jun 2021)
Luis Bernardino Núñez Villacís (5 Jul 2021 – present)

Sources
GCatholic.org
Catholic Hierarchy

Roman Catholic dioceses in Ecuador
Roman Catholic Ecclesiastical Province of Quito
Christian organizations established in 1965
Roman Catholic dioceses and prelatures established in the 20th century